Gliocladium vermoeseni is a plant pathogen. It is a disease of palm species.

References

External links 
 USDA ARS Fungal Database

Fungal plant pathogens and diseases
Fungi described in 1930
Hypocreaceae